Alan Gogayev (born March 8, 1990, in North Ossetia–Alania) is a Russian freestyle wrestler.  He was the runner up at the 2010 World Wrestling Championships in Moscow, Russia, won bronze at the 2017 World Championships in Paris and was European Champion in 2012 in Belgrade, Serbia. He competed in the 66 kg event at the 2012 Summer Olympics in London, where he was defeated in the first round by Zalimkhan Yusupov from Tajikistan.

References

External links
 

1990 births
Living people
People from Digorsky District
Russian male sport wrestlers
Wrestlers at the 2012 Summer Olympics
Olympic wrestlers of Russia
World Wrestling Championships medalists
Sportspeople from North Ossetia–Alania
20th-century Russian people
21st-century Russian people